A constitutional referendum was held in France on 24 September 2000. The proposal  to reduce the mandate of the President from seven years to five years was approved by 73.2% of those who voted, but turnout was just 30.2%.

Background
The idea of a five-year term was discussed during the French parliamentary session of 1848, but rejected in favor of a four-year term. A seven-year term was adopted in 1873 for what became the Third Republic. In 2000, Jacques Chirac led the campaign for the referendum reducing the President's term from seven to five years. After he was re-elected in 2002, his term ended in 2007 rather than 2009. The aim of the quinquennat (five-year term) was for the legislative elections to follow the presidential election (as the presidential election took place in April–May 2007, while the legislative election took place in June), providing similar electoral results and reducing the risk of cohabitation.

Results

See also
Constitutional amendments under the Fifth French Republic
Sexenio (Mexico)

References

External links
Proclamation of the results of the referendum of 24 September 2000, Constitutional Council of France, 28 September 2000
Decree 2000-655 of 12 July 2000, from the President of France, submitting a constitutional amendment to referendum
"French poll sounds alarm to political elite". The Guardian, 26 September 2000

Term limits
Constitutional referendum
France
Constitutional amendments
Referendums in France
Constitutional referendums in France
Constitutional referendum